The Greatest Baseball Game Never Played was a 1982 simulated broadcast of a hypothetical baseball game between all-time Major League Baseball greats.  The broadcast was aired on 200 radio stations in the United States and Canada and also released as a record album.

The simulated game was announced by Jack Buck and Lindsey Nelson and set in Philadelphia's Shibe Park.  Following the format of the All-Star Game, it featured National League players against players from the American League.  The National League won 5-4.

Starting lineups 
 American League: Phil Rizutto, SS; Ty Cobb, CF; Ted Williams, LF; Babe Ruth, RF; Lou Gehrig, 1B; Rod Carew, 2B; Yogi Berra, C; Brooks Robinson, 3B; Whitey Ford, P.
 National League: Pete Rose, 1B; Mike Schmidt, 3B; Stan Musial, RF; Hank Aaron, LF; Willie Mays, CF; Rogers Hornsby, 2B; Honus Wagner, SS; Roy Campanella, C; Sandy Koufax, P.

Legacy 
The Greatest Game Never Played documents the perception of who the greatest players were seventeen years before the selection of the Major League Baseball All-Century Team. All of the players in both starting lineups made the All-Century team except for American League shortstop Phil Rizzuto, as the 1980s saw the emergence of several all-time great shortstops: Cal Ripken Jr., Ozzie Smith, and Robin Yount.

References

External links
 Audio digitizing of the vinyl LP 

Major League Baseball on the radio
1982 Major League Baseball season
1982 in radio
History of baseball broadcasting